Andrei Sergeyevich Semyonov (born 24 March 1989) is a Russian professional football player. He plays as a centre-back for Akhmat Grozny.

Club career

Amkar
He made his Russian Premier League debut for FC Amkar Perm on 25 November 2012 in a game against FC Anzhi Makhachkala and scored a goal in that game (Amkar lost 1–2).

Akhmat Grozny
On 4 February 2014, Amkar announced Semyonov's transfer to RFPL rivals Terek Grozny.

On 19 May 2019, Semyonov extended his contract with Akhmat Grozny until the summer of 2022. On 14 June 2022, Semyonov signed a new two-year contract with Akhmat.

International
He made his debut for the Russia national football team on 31 May 2014 in a friendly against Norway.

On 2 June 2014, he was included in the Russia's 2014 FIFA World Cup squad.

On 11 May 2018, he was included in Russia's extended 2018 FIFA World Cup squad. On 3 June 2018, he was included in the finalized World Cup squad. He didn't make any appearance for the squad in the tournament, that was the second World Cup in a row he was included in the squad but did not end up playing in any games.

On 11 May 2021, he was included in the preliminary extended 30-man squad for UEFA Euro 2020. On 2 June 2021, he was included in the final squad. He played the full match in Russia's opening game against Belgium on 12 June 2021, making his major tournament debut as Russia lost 0–3. His mistake while clearing the ball led to Romelu Lukaku's opening goal in the 10th minute. He did not appear in two remaining games as Russia was eliminated at group stage.

Career statistics

Club

International
Statistics accurate as of match played 15 November 2020.

References

External links 

1989 births
Footballers from Moscow
Living people
Russian footballers
Russia youth international footballers
Russia international footballers
Association football defenders
2014 FIFA World Cup players
2018 FIFA World Cup players
UEFA Euro 2020 players
FC Sokol Saratov players
FC Nosta Novotroitsk players
FC SKA-Khabarovsk players
FC Amkar Perm players
FC Akhmat Grozny players
Russian Premier League players
Russian First League players
Russian Second League players